The following is a list of events affecting radio broadcasting in 2013. Events listed include radio program debuts, finales, cancellations, and station launches, closures and format changes, as well as information about controversies.

Notable events

January

February

March

May

June

July

September

October

December

Débuts

Endings

Deaths

References